Yongning is a town under the administration of Guanling Buyei and Miao Autonomous County, Guizhou, China. , it has one residential community and 11 villages under its administration.

References 

Township-level divisions of Guizhou
Guanling Buyei and Miao Autonomous County